Hardworlder is the sixth studio album released by the American heavy metal band Slough Feg (formerly known as The Lord Weird Slough Feg).  A vinyl edition was released in 2008 by Iron Kodex Records.  The pressing was limited to 525 copies.  The first 100 of them were the orange "Gully Foyle" edition.

Track listing 

"Dearg Doom" is a cover of a Horslips song from their 1973 album The Táin.
"Street Jammer" is a cover of a Manilla Road song from their 1980 album Invasion.

Personnel 
 Mike Scalzi - Vocals/Guitar
 Angelo Tringali - Guitar
 Adrian Maestas - Bass
 Antoine-Diavola - Drums

Additional personnel
 Dan Cilli/Mike Scalzi - Operatic vocals on "Insomnia"
 Producer - Mike Scalzi and Justin Phelps
 Engineer – Justin Phelps
 Engineer [Additional] – Raymond Ruiz
 Mastering – Justin Weis
 Artwork – James E. Lyle
 Photography – Adrian Maestas
 Design – Scott Hoffman/Eyedolatry

External links 
Album entry at Encyclopaedia Metallum

2007 albums
Slough Feg albums
Science fiction albums